Henry Longfellow School was a historic school building located in the Bridesburg neighborhood of Philadelphia, Pennsylvania. It was designed by Henry deCourcy Richards and built in 1915. It was a three-story, six-bay, brick building on a raised basement in the Classical Revival style. It featured a stone cornice and beltcourse and a brick parapet.  The school was named for poet Henry Wadsworth Longfellow.

The building was added to the National Register of Historic Places in 1988.

Demolition of the school commenced on August 17, 2015, in conjunction with the plans to rebuild and widen Interstate 95 as part of the ongoing reconstruction of the Interstate in Northeast Philadelphia.

References

School buildings on the National Register of Historic Places in Philadelphia
Neoclassical architecture in Pennsylvania
School buildings completed in 1915
Frankford, Philadelphia
Demolished buildings and structures in Philadelphia
Buildings and structures demolished in 2015
1915 establishments in Pennsylvania